Theila triplaga is a moth in the family Crambidae. It was described by Oswald Bertram Lower in 1903. It is found in Australia, where it has been recorded from Queensland and Western Australia.

The forewings are white with yellow markings. The hindwings are white with a row of black dots along the margin.

References

Acentropinae
Moths described in 1903
Moths of Australia